Piotr Józef Hofmański (born 6 March 1956) is a Polish jurist and judge who has served as President of the International Criminal Court (ICC) since 2021. He has been a judge of the ICC since 2015. His election into the Presidency of the ICC is for a three-year term. Prior to his tenure as a judge of the ICC, Hofmański was a legal expert and advisor at the Council of Europe.

Early life and education 
Piotr Hofmański was born in Poznań, Polish People's Republic on 6 March 1956. He obtained his master of laws degree from the Nicolaus Copernicus University in Toruń in 1978. He got his doctor of laws degree from the same university in 1981. He was habiltized at the University of Silesia in Katowice in 1990.

Council of Europe 
In 2001–2002 he was working as an expert at the Council of Europe in the Reflection Group on developments in international cooperation in criminal matters and in 2004–2006 in the Committee of Experts on Transnational Justice.

Judge 
He began his career as a judge on the bench of the appellate court in Białystok in 1994. In 1996–2015 he was a judge in the Criminal Chamber of the Supreme Court of Poland. In 1999 he served as the court's spokesperson.

In December 2014 he was elected as a judge of the International Criminal Court for the 2015–2024 term. He was the first person from Poland elected to that post. He was officially sworn in on 10 March 2015 with five other judges. In March 2021 he was elected President of the International Criminal Court for the term 2021–2024. He will serve with judges Luz del Carmen Ibáñez Carranza and Antoine Kesia-Mbe Mindua as his Vice-presidents.

Decorations 
In 2000 he was awarded the Silver Cross of Merit by the President Aleksander Kwaśniewski.

Private life 
He is fluent in Polish, English and German. He is married and has three daughters.

Publications 
Hofmański authored and co-authored more than 300 publications regarding various aspects of criminal law and procedure, international cooperation in criminal matters and human rights protection. Many of his publications have been written and published in German and/or English.

References 

1956 births
Academic staff of Jagiellonian University
Nicolaus Copernicus University in Toruń alumni
20th-century Polish judges
Polish judges of international courts and tribunals
Polish legal scholars
Presidents of the International Criminal Court
Recipients of the Silver Cross of Merit (Poland)
Scholars of criminal law
Academic staff of the University of Silesia in Katowice
Living people
21st-century Polish judges